Vice-Admiral Arthur Lionel Snagge, CB (4 May 1878 - 1955) was a Royal Navy officer who was Admiral-Superintendent of Devonport Dockyard.

Naval career

Snagge entered the Royal Navy as an acting sub-lieutenant on 15 August 1898, and was confirmed in this rank the following year. On 19 March 1900 he was posted to the gunboat HMS Redbreast. He was promoted to lieutenant on 31 December 1900, and to Commander on 30 June 1913. Taking command of the newly commissioned monitor HMS Humber in 1914, he served with her throughout most of the First world war in Europe and in the Mediterranean. He was mentioned in despatches for service in the Eastern Mediterranean December 1915-January 1916, and the same year received the Order of the Nile, 4th class, from the Sultan of Egypt.

He was appointed British Naval attache to Washington, D.C. in May 1918, promoted to captain on 30 June 1919, and returned in November that year to take a position in the Naval Intelligence Division. For his service in the US during the latte part of the war, he received the Distinguished Service Medal from the United States Army.

Following a series of active commands of various ships in the 1920s, Snagge was appointed Commodore-in-Command of the Royal Naval barracks at Chatham Dockyard in November 1929, serving as such until July 1931. After a staff appointment at the Admiralty, he was on 2 March 1935 appointed Admiral-Superintendent of HM Dockyard Devonport, and served as such until September 1938. He was promoted to vice admiral on 1 January 1936, and placed on the Retired List the following day.

Snagge was appointed a Companion of the Order of the Bath (CB) in the 1933 Birthday Honours.

Personal life

References

External links
Portrait at website of National Portrait Gallery

1878 births
1955 deaths
Royal Navy admirals
Companions of the Order of the Bath
British naval attachés
Royal Navy officers of World War I